Dilolo Lake is the largest lake in Angola. It is located in Moxico Province. The lake is located right outside of Cameia National Park.

References

Dilolo
Moxico Province